Chase Buchanan and Blaž Rola were the defending champions but chose not to participate.

Fabrício Neis and Caio Zampieri won the title, defeating José Pereira and Alexandre Tsuchiya 6–4, 7–6(7–3) in the final.

Seeds

Draw

References
 Main Draw

São Paulo Challenger de Tênis - Doubles